Abacetus semiopacus is a species of ground beetle in the subfamily Pterostichinae. It was described by Straneo in 1948. The beetle inhabits Africa, Australia and Asia and is one of 417 species in the Carabidae.

References

Further reading
H. E. Andrewes (1942). "Key to some Indian genera of Carabidae (Col.) XI. The genus Abacetus". Proceedings of the Royal Entomological Society of London B. 11 (2): 21–35. doi:10.1111/j.1365-3113.1942.tb00721.x.
"Abacetus Dejean, 1828". Carabidae of the World. 2011. Retrieved 27 Mar 2012.
Andrewes, H. E. (1924). "Coleoptera of the Siju Cave, Garo Hills, Assam: I. Carabidae" (PDF). Records of the Indian Museum. 26 (1): 116–117.

semiopacus
Beetles described in 1948